Sabal rosei, the Llanos palmetto or Savannah palmetto, is a species of flowering plant in the palm family Arecaceae, native to the Pacific coast of Mexico, from Sinaloa to Jalisco. Hardy to USDA zone 8a, it tolerates both flooding and drought, although it is typically found in dry areas.

References

rosei
Endemic flora of Mexico
Flora of Sinaloa
Flora of Nayarit
Flora of Jalisco
Plants described in 1907